55 Marietta Street, formerly the Fulton National Bank Building and the Bank South Building is a 21-story,  office building in Atlanta, Georgia. It was the tallest building in the city when completed in 1958 until surpassed by One Park Tower in 1961. 55 Marietta Street is the site of the U.S. Post Office and Customs House (built 1878), which served from 1910 to 1930 as City Hall (demolished 1930s)

See also
List of tallest buildings in Atlanta

References

Office buildings completed in 1958
Skyscraper office buildings in Atlanta